Iulian-Gabriel Bîrsan (29 October 1956 – 27 August 2022) was a Romanian engineer and politician. A member of the Democratic Party, he served in the Chamber of Deputies from September to December 2004.

Bîrsan died on 27 August 2022, at the age of 65.

References

1956 births
2022 deaths
Members of the Chamber of Deputies (Romania)
Democratic Party (Romania) politicians
Democratic Liberal Party (Romania) politicians
People from Târgu Bujor
21st-century Romanian politicians